For the Peace of Bear Valley is a 1913 American silent short Western directed by Frank E. Montgomery. The film stars Harry van Meter and Mona Darkfeather.

Cast
 Harry van Meter as The Sheriff
 Mona Darkfeather as Mona
 Inez Fanjoy as Dell
 Arthur Ortego as Ortega
 Harry Schumm as The Lumber Merchant

External links
 

1913 films
1913 Western (genre) films
American silent short films
American black-and-white films
Silent American Western (genre) films
1910s American films
1910s English-language films